The Big Trout is a 10-metre-high fibreglass model in Adaminaby, New South Wales, Australia, a popular fishing spot for trout. Built in 1973 by local artist and fisherman, Andy Lomnici, the Big Trout is part of more than 150 Big Things located throughout Australia. Originally conceived by Leigh Stewart, the Snowy Mountains Authority assisted with funding, and work on the trout started in 1971.

Construction

Andy Lomnici used a frozen trout as a guide, and built the final work in fibreglass over mesh and a steel frame. The scales were produced by covering the work in mesh, adding a final layer of fiberglass, and then removing the mesh before it set.

In 2012 the work was repainted to celebrate the centenary of the Snowy River Shire.

See also

Australia's big things
List of world's largest roadside attractions

References

External links

Big things in New South Wales
1973 sculptures
Fiberglass sculptures in Australia
Snowy Mountains Highway
Adaminaby
Fishing in Australia
Fish in art